The Buzuluk is a river in Volgograd Oblast, Russia. It has its sources on the westernmost slopes of the Volga Upland. During dry periods the upper reaches of the river dry up completely.

The town of Novoanninsky and the stanitsa of Preobrazhenskaya  lie along the river.

Etymology
The word is formed from the Turkic "buza" (Bashkir buzаu, Tatar bozau, Kazakh bұzau, Turkish buzağı) which means "calf", -lik suffixes refers that it belongs to something. According to another version, the word is formed from the Turkic "buz" (Bashkir boz, Tatar boz, Kazakh muz, Turkish buz) literally means "ice"..

References

Rivers of Volgograd Oblast